Dandridge is a surname. Notable people with the surname include:

 Bartholomew Dandridge (1737–1785), American lawyer, jurist, and planter.
 Bartholomew Dandridge (1691–c.1754), English portrait painter.
 Bob Dandridge (1947), American basketball player.
 Danske Dandridge (1854–1914), American poet, historian and garden writer.
 Dorothy Jean Dandridge (1922–1965), American film and theatre actress, singer and dancer.
 Ed Dandridge, Corporate Executive.
 John Dandridge (1700–1756), Virginian colonel, planter, and clerk.
 Joseph Dandridge (1665–1747), English silk-pattern designer
 Martha Dandridge (1731–1802), (later Martha Washington) first First Lady of the United States.
 Merle Dandridge (born 1975), American actress.
 Nicola Dandridge, English Lawyer.
 Putney Dandridge (1902–1946), American bandleader, jazz pianist and vocalist.
 Ray Dandridge (1913–1994), American baseball player.
 Ruby Dandridge (1900–1987), American actress
 Violet Dandridge (1878–1956), American scientific illustrator, painter, naturalist, and suffragist
 Vivian Dandridge (1921–1991), American singer, actress and dancer.

See also
 Dandridge (comics), a fictional character in the British comic anthology 2000 AD
 Battle of Dandridge
 Dandridge Sisters
 Dandridge, Tennessee
 Dandridge v. Williams